The 2017 Commonwealth Youth Games, officially known as the VI Commonwealth Youth Games, and commonly known as Bahamas 2017, or Nassau 2017, was the sixth edition of the Commonwealth Youth Games which started in 2000. The games were held from 19 to 23 July 2017 in Nassau, Bahamas. 64 nations participated at the games. The Bahamas 2017 was the largest international sporting event ever to be hosted in The Bahamas, and the largest-ever edition of the Youth Games, with up to 1300 athletes. During the opening ceremony the Prime Minister of the Bahamas Hubert Minnis declared the games officially open. It was the first the time that the tournament was opened by a prime minister instead of a monarch or a president.

Host selection 

They were planned to be held in Castries, the capital of Saint Lucia, but Saint Lucia withdrew in 2015, citing financial difficulties. Canada and Scotland both offered to host the games if no other nation was willing to bid.

In 2016, Nassau, Bahamas, was selected to host the 2017 edition.

The Games 

It was the second edition of the Youth Games to be held on a Small Island Developing State, following the hugely successful Samoa 2015 Commonwealth Youth Games in September 2015. It was also be the first Commonwealth Games event to be held in the Caribbean for over 50 years, with Commonwealth athletes last participating in the 1966 Commonwealth Games in Kingston, Jamaica.

The Games were coordinated by the Bahamas Commonwealth Games Association and the Bahamas' Ministry of Youth, Sports and Culture. The sports contested at the Bahamas 2017 were athletics, swimming, beach soccer, boxing, cycling (road), judo, rugby sevens, tennis, and beach volleyball. It was the first time judo, beach soccer, and beach volleyball have been presented at a Commonwealth Youth Games.

 Athletics – Thomas A. Robinson National Stadium
 Beach soccer – Bahamas Football Association National Stadium
 Beach volleyball - Queen Elizabeth Sports Center
 Boxing and judo – Sir Kendal G. L. Isaacs Gymnasium
 Cycling – Streets of New Providence
 Rugby sevens – Old Thomas A. Robinson Stadium
 Swimming – Betty Kelly-Kenning National Swim Complex
 Tennis – National Tennis Center

Participating nations 

There were 64 participating nations at the Games. The following countries did not send any athletes: Brunei Darussalam, Cameroon, Falkland Islands, Montserrat, Seychelles and Swaziland. The number of athletes a nation entered is in parentheses beside the name of the country.

 

 
 (host nation)

Sports

The 2017 Games featured nine sports and introduced three new sports—beach soccer, judo and beach volleyball—whilst dropping archery, lawn bowls, weightlifting, and squash. cycling also made a return during these Games.

Schedule

Medal table

References

External links 

 Official website
 Official website (archived)

 
Bahamas and the Commonwealth of Nations
2017
Commonwealth Youth Games
Commonwealth Youth Games
Commonwealth Youth Games
International sports competitions hosted by the Bahamas